A total of seven chess players have been the chess world number one on the official FIDE rating list since it was first published in July 1971.

The first world number one, in July 1971, was Bobby Fischer. In January 1976 Anatoly Karpov became the highest-rated player on the FIDE list, FIDE having dropped Fischer (whose rating was higher than Karpov's) from the list due to inactivity. In January 1984, the third world number one was Garry Kasparov. Anatoly Karpov briefly held the world number one ranking in July 1985, and the fourth world number one, Vladimir Kramnik, briefly held the ranking in January 1996. Other than these two brief periods, Kasparov dominated for some 22 years from 1984 until his retirement from professional chess on 10 March 2005. In January 1990, he surpassed Fischer's peak of 2785 and became the first player ever to achieve a 2800 rating. In July 1999, he reached his peak rating, 2851. This was the highest FIDE rating in history until January 2013, when it was surpassed by Magnus Carlsen.

On Kasparov's retirement, the world number one ranking passed to Veselin Topalov, since Kasparov was removed from the rating list in April 2006 due to inactivity. In April 2007, Viswanathan Anand became the sixth player to top the rankings. Kramnik briefly returned to the number one ranking in January 2008, but was again joint number one by rating, being placed first in the list due to having played more games in the rating period in question. For most of the period April 2007 to November 2009, the top ranking was held by either Anand or Topalov. The seventh and current world number one is Magnus Carlsen, who first achieved this ranking in the January 2010 list, and has been world number one since July 2011 after having lost and reclaimed the position from Anand during 2010 and 2011.

Publication details

There were unofficial lists in 1964, 1969, 1970 and January 1971, as the Elo rating system was first introduced.

From 1971 to 1980, there was one main rating list published each year (for a total of 10), initially published in July from 1971 to 1973, then once in May (1974), before switching to annual publication in January from 1975 to 1980 (in this period, some supplements and amendments were also published).

From 1981 to July 2000, two lists per year were published, in January and July (for a total of 39 lists). In July 2000, the publication schedule was increased to four times a year (January, April, July, October) operating from July 2000 to July 2009 (for a total of 36 lists). In July 2009, the publication schedule was increased again, to six times a year (January, March, May, July, September, November) operating from July 2009 to July 2012 (for a total of 18 lists). In July 2012 the publication schedule was increased again to the current monthly schedule.

Publication of the rating lists in the 1970s and 1980s was in Chess Informant and other chess publications. The number of games played by individuals during the rating period was added to the lists from July 1985 onwards. Player ID numbers were used from January 1990. From January 1999, the practice of rounding to the nearest five Elo points was discontinued, and ratings were then rounded to the nearest Elo point for publication. From July 2000 onwards, the ratings are available from the FIDE website.

In January 2010 former World Champion Boris Spassky criticized the current emphasis on ratings rather than World Champions. Although Spassky was World Champion during the inception of the FIDE rankings in 1971, he never became the number-one rated player in the world; since July 1971 he and Vladimir Kramnik are the only undisputed World Champions to never become ranked world number-one during their tenure as champions.

List of world number ones

Top players (list) 
The following is a list of the players ranked number one on the FIDE rating system from the first official list in July 1971 to the present day, along with their ratings during the periods in question. Kasparov was removed from FIDE ratings in 1994.

Timeline of world number ones

Player statistics
As of June 2017, seven players have held the world number one ranking over a period of 46 years and 0 months, encompassing 162 rating lists. These seven players include six undisputed world chess champions, with Topalov being the only player to achieve the number one ranking without becoming undisputed world champion, though he was FIDE world champion from 2005 to 2006, and is still an active player. Kramnik and Spassky are the only world champions in the period in question to never have been world number one while being champion.

Fischer was top of the lists successively five times over a period of 4.5 years, though he is considered to have already become the number one player in the world before the official list started, as he topped the unofficial list in 1970. Karpov topped the list 12 times, successively 11 times over a period of 8 years, and once for 6 months. Kasparov has been world number one on the official list 54 times over a period of 22 years, and 31 times successively over nearly a decade from July 1996 to January 2006; he was number one 3 times successively over 1.5 years, then 20 times successively over 10 years, then finally 31 times over 9 years and 9 months. Kramnik was world number one 2 times (for 6 and 3 months), for a total of 9 months. Topalov has been world number one successively 4 and 6 times (a total of 10 times), for 12 months and 15 months respectively (for a total of 27 months). Anand has been world number one successively 2 and 3 times (a total of 5 times), for 6 months and 9 months respectively (for a total of 15 months). Carlsen has been world number one a record 119 times, including a record 107 consecutive times from July 2011 until May 2020.

Women

List of world female number ones

The following is a list of the players ranked number one female on the FIDE rating system from the first official list in July 1971 to the present day, along with their ratings during the periods in question.

Timeline

Women statistics

List of junior world number ones

FIDE publishes lists of highest-rated junior chess players; a "junior" is defined as being a player who is aged under 20 at the start of the year. The following is a list of the players ranked number one junior in the FIDE rating system from July 1999 to the present day, along with their ratings during the periods in question.

List of girl world number ones

FIDE publishes lists of highest-rated girl chess players; a "girl" is defined as being a player who is aged under 20 at the start of the year, and female. The following is a list of the players ranked number one girl in the FIDE rating system from January 2000 to the present day, along with their ratings during the periods in question.

Rapid and blitz ratings
Since January 2012, FIDE has also calculated ratings for Rapid and Blitz chess, and has published top player rating lists for these time controls since May 2014.

Rapid chess

Top players

Top women

Top juniors

Top girls

Blitz chess

Top players (blitz)

Top women (blitz)

Top juniors (blitz)

Top girls (blitz)

See also

Comparison of top chess players throughout history
Chess rating systems
List of chess players by peak FIDE rating

Notes

References

External links
All Time Rankings, includes "Top 10 lists from 1970 to 1997"
FIDE historical ratings (1970–2000)
World Top Chess players (from FIDE, includes archive of FIDE Top Lists from July 2000 to the present)

Lists of chess players
Chess rating systems